The men's singles snooker competition at the 2022 World Games took place from 13 to 17 July 2022 at the Birmingham Jefferson Convention Complex in Birmingham, United States.

Competition format
A total of 16 players entered the competition. They competed in knock-out system.

Bracket

Final

References

2022 in snooker
Cue sports at the 2022 World Games
Snooker at the World Games